Willows Nunatak is a nunatak standing 1 nautical mile (1.9 km) inland from the south shore of Wood Bay on the coast of Victoria Land, rising above the col between Cape Washington and Mount Melbourne. Mapped by United States Geological Survey (USGS) from surveys and U.S. Navy air photos, 1955–63. Named by Advisory Committee on Antarctic Names (US-ACAN) for A.O. Dennis Willows, biologist at McMurdo Station, summer 1965–66.

Nunataks of Victoria Land
Borchgrevink Coast